Lim Su-kyung (also spelled Lim Soo-kyung; ; born 6 November 1968) is a South Korean activist and politician. She is best known for attending the 13th World Festival of Youth and Students, held in North Korea and praising President of North Korea Kim Il-sung  in 1989, without first obtaining travel permission from the South Korean government. She attended the festival representing the student organization Jeondaehyop, now known as Hanchongryun. Upon her return to South Korea, she was arrested and sentenced to five years in prison.

Visit to North Korea 
In 1989, Lim (then a 4th year student majoring in French at Hankuk University of Foreign Studies) famously visited North Korea to attend the 13th World Festival of Youth and Students as the one-person delegation of the League of South Korean University Students. Initially, the league was denied permission to send a delegation by South Korean authorities (the Roh Tae-woo administration). Undeterred, the league tasked a student group particularly known for its international connections, Korean Student Christian Federation, with making the visit possible, and so Lim got involved. She was not a student leader but more of a "messenger". An itinerary was carefully planned to get her into North Korea without attracting the attention of South Korean intelligence. She traveled for 10 days to reach the North via Japan and Germany. Her stay there lasted 45 days and culminated in meeting President Kim Il-sung.

Lim crossed the Korean Demilitarized Zone (DMZ) back into South Korea on 15 August 1989. She was the first civilian from either of the two Koreas to openly do so since the end of the Korean War. She was arrested on charges of violating the National Security Act. Some of her student associates were arrested as well. Lim was initially sentenced to prison for 12 years, which was later commuted to five. She ended up serving only three years and was released under a special amnesty. She was pardoned in 1999 by South Korean President Kim Dae-jung. Lim claims that her attendance at the Festival was a purely selfless act.

Lim's legacy took two separate trajectories in South Korea, where her reputation was tarnished as she was seen to have embarrassed her country's authorities, and in the North, where she is considered a hero. In the South, she is considered one of the most controversial visitors to the North. In the North, Lim was given the nickname Flower of Unification or Flower of Reunification by the North Korean government. She was also made the subject of the documentary Hail Lim Su-kyung, the Flower of Unification (1989).

Political career 
In April 2012, she was elected to the 19th National Assembly as the Democratic United Party's 21st proportional representative.

In June 2012, in a confrontation with a North Korean defector in a bar, Lim hurled insults and referred to ruling party lawmaker Ha Tae-keung (하태경) as a "son-of-a-bitch betrayer" and another as a "traitor" in what was described by Korea JoongAng Daily as "an alcohol-fueled tirade at a Seoul restaurant", questioning their legitimacy to challenge her as a lawmaker. This led to public protests.

The Argentinian filmmaker José Luis García made the 2012 documentary La chica del sur ("The Girl From the South") on Lim and his experience at the 13th World Festival of Youth and Students, where he met her. The film shows Lim's struggle for a reunified Korea in 1989, and two further reunions between her and Garcia in South Korea and Argentina in 2012. La chica del sur tries to show the development of her thoughts and character after years of media attention, prison, the tragic death of her son and divorce. It was shown and awarded in the Buenos Aires International Independent Film Festival (BAFICI) 2012 and Lakino festival 2013. In 2014, the documentary received the Argentine Film Critics Association Silver Condor (Cóndor de Plata) for Best Documentary.

See also
 Juche faction, the South Korean political faction advocating Juche
 Pomchonghakryon, the North Korean organization roughly equivalent to Hanchongryun
 Korean reunification
 Politics of South Korea
 South Korean defectors
 386 Generation

References

Citations

Sources

External links 
 임수경 방북 사건 
 임수경평양축전참가사건 
 [고종석 기획연재 여자들] <21> 임수경　통일이 되든, 안 되든… 그녀는 영원한 '통일의 꽃'이다 – 한국일보 2009년 06월 22일 
 임수경 막말 논란… 백요셉 "탈북 대학생에 하태경 변절자XX 내손으로" 폭언 

1968 births
Minjoo Party of Korea politicians
Korean nationalists
Living people
Members of the National Assembly (South Korea)
21st-century South Korean women politicians
21st-century South Korean politicians
South Korean Roman Catholics
Hankuk University of Foreign Studies alumni
Left-wing nationalism in South Korea
Sogang University alumni
Female members of the National Assembly (South Korea)